Großer Wummsee is a lake in Landkreis Ostprignitz-Ruppin, Brandenburg, Germany. At an elevation of 61,0 m, its surface area is 1.52 km².

Lakes of Brandenburg